AFC Pontymister is a Welsh football team based in Pontymister, a small village in Caerphilly county borough in Wales. The team currently play in the Gwent County League Premier Division, which is at the fourth tier of the Welsh football league system.

History
The club was originally formed in the mid 1950s playing under a variety of names, which included Pontymister Rovers, Pontymister Rangers and plain Pontymister. A further name change to AC Pontymister occurred in 1977 following an enforced relocation of their home ground from Tanybryn to Pontymister Recreation Ground.

The Club have been members of the Gwent County league since its formation at the start of the 1980s and have had a second side within the Newport and District Football League.

Honours
Gwent County League Division Two - Champions: 2009–10; 2016–17
Gwent County League Division Three - Champions: 2008-09

External links
Official Club twitter

References

Football clubs in Wales
Gwent County League clubs